Falsimohnia innocens is a species of sea snail, a marine gastropod mollusk in the family Buccinidae, the true whelks.

Description

Distribution

References

 Kantor Yu.I. & Harasewych M.G. (2013) Antarctica, where turrids and whelks converge: A revision of Falsimohnia Powell, 1951 (Neogastropoda: Buccinoidea) and a description of a new genus. The Nautilus 127(2): 43(56.

Buccinidae
Fauna of the Southern Ocean
Gastropods described in 1907
Taxa named by Edgar Albert Smith